Tomáš Šach (born July 22, 1947) is a Czechoslovak sprint canoer who competed in the mid-1970s. He two medals in the C-2 500 m event at the ICF Canoe Sprint World Championships with a silver in 1975 and a bronze in 1974.

Šach also competed at the 1976 Summer Olympics in Montreal, finishing sixth in the C-2 1000 m and eighth in the C-2 500 m events.

References

Sports-reference.com profile

1947 births
Canoeists at the 1976 Summer Olympics
Czechoslovak male canoeists
Living people
Olympic canoeists of Czechoslovakia
ICF Canoe Sprint World Championships medalists in Canadian